Maria Alvarez may refer to:

 Maria Carla Alvarez (born 1984), Argentine cyclist
 Maria Alvarez (weightlifter) (born 1987), Venezuelan weightlifter 
 María Álvarez (athlete) Spanish paralympic athlete
 María Álvarez (swimmer), Colombian swimmer